IKI may refer to:

 Internationales Kulturinstitut in Vienna
 Iodine potassium-iodide, a chemical compound
 Russian Space Research Institute originally known as IKI RAN
 Iki Airport, IATA code

Iki or iki may refer to:

 Iki Island, a Japanese island between the island of Kyūshū and the Tsushima islands in the Tsushima Strait
 Iki, Nagasaki, a city on Iki Island
 Iki Province, a former province of Japan, now part of Nagasaki Prefecture
 Iki (aesthetics), a Japanese aesthetical concept
 iki (album), an album by Värttinä
 The name of a chain of supermarkets in Lithuania, and previously in Latvia also, operated by Palink